Giovanni delle Bande Nere has been the name of at least two ships of the Italian Navy, named in honour of Giovanni delle Bande Nere:

 Italian cruiser Giovanni delle Bande Nere, a Giussano-class cruiser launched in 1930
 , a  launched in 2022

Italian Navy ship names